Goromonzi West is a constituency of the National Assembly of the Parliament of Zimbabwe, located in Mashonaland East Province. Its current MP since the 2018 election is Energy Mutodi of ZANU–PF.

History 

It was created in the delimitation of 2008 from the former Goromonzi constituency, and covers Makumbe, Parirewa, Domboshava and Makumbe Mission. In the March 2008 parliamentary election the seat was won by the ZANU-PF candidate who defeated the MDC candidate from the Morgan Tsvangirai faction (MDC-T) by just 262 votes. In the 2013 election the ZANU-PF candidate, Biata B. Nyamupinga, was again challenged by Ian Makone (MDC-T) as well as by Wonder Chinamora (MDC). Nyamupinga retained her seat in the Assembly. A recount in Goromonzi West was conducted in April 2008, increasing ZANU-PF's total by one vote, from 6,193 to 6,194.

In the July 2018 parliamentary election the seat was won by the ZANU-PF candidate who defeated the MDC candidate from the Nelson Chamisa faction (MDC-T): The ZANU-PF candidate, Energy Mutodi, was again challenged by Tamborinyoka (MDC-A) as well as by Wonder Chinamora (MDC); Mutodi retained his seat in the Assembly.

Election results

References

2008 establishments in Zimbabwe
Constituencies established in 2008
Goromonzi District
Parliamentary constituencies in Zimbabwe